The swimming competition at the 1998 Goodwill Games was held in New York City, New York, USA from 28 July to 2 August.

The format is a team competition.The men's teams are the United States, China, Germany and a World All-Star team and the women's teams are the United States, Russia, Germany and a World All-Star team.

Each men and women’s team competes in a round-robin, dual meet format of 14 events for a total of three dual meets per team. Team accumulates points based upon placement of its entries. Individual event medals are also awarded based upon the overall fastest times in all the competition.

Men's events

Women's events

References 

 1998 Goodwill Games Swimming Results 

1998 Goodwill Games
1998
1998 in swimming